Lech Stoltman (born 2 February 1985) is a Polish Paralympic athlete competing in F55-classification shot put events. He represented Poland at the 2016 Summer Paralympics held in Rio de Janeiro, Brazil and he won the bronze medal in the men's shot put F55 event. He also won the bronze medal in this event at the 2020 Summer Paralympics held in Tokyo, Japan.

Career 

At the 2016 IPC Athletics European Championships held in Grosseto, Italy, he won the bronze medal in the men's shot put F55 event.

At the 2017 World Para Athletics Championships held in London, United Kingdom, he won the silver medal in the men's shot put F55 event. At the 2019 World Para Athletics Championships held in Dubai, United Arab Emirates, he also won the silver medal in this event. As a result, he qualified to represent Poland at the 2020 Summer Paralympics in Tokyo, Japan in the men's shot put F55 event.

Achievements

References

External links 
 

Living people
1985 births
Place of birth missing (living people)
Athletes (track and field) at the 2016 Summer Paralympics
Athletes (track and field) at the 2020 Summer Paralympics
Medalists at the 2016 Summer Paralympics
Medalists at the 2020 Summer Paralympics
Paralympic bronze medalists for Poland
Polish male shot putters
Paralympic athletes of Poland
Paralympic medalists in athletics (track and field)
Medalists at the World Para Athletics Championships
Medalists at the World Para Athletics European Championships